The 1992–93 FA Trophy was the twenty-fourth season of the FA Trophy.

First qualifying round

Ties

Replays

2nd replays

Second qualifying round

Ties

Replays

2nd replay

3rd replay

Third qualifying round

Ties

Replays

2nd replay

1st round
The teams that given byes to this round are Wycombe Wanderers, Kettering Town, Merthyr Tydfil, Farnborough Town, Telford United, Dagenham & Redbridge, Boston United, Bath City, Witton Albion, Northwich Victoria, Welling United, Macclesfield Town, Gateshead, Yeovil Town, Runcorn, Altrincham, Kidderminster Harriers, Bromsgrove Rovers, Stalybridge Celtic, Woking, Cheltenham Town, Barrow, Aylesbury United, Dover Athletic, Hyde United, Gretna, Gloucester City, Enfield, Wivenhoe Town, Marine and Murton.

Ties

Replays

2nd round

Ties

Replays

2nd replay

3rd replay

3rd round

Ties

Replays

4th round

Ties

Semi finals

First leg

Second leg

Final

Tie

References

General
 Football Club History Database: FA Trophy 1992-93

Specific

1992–93 domestic association football cups
League
1992-93